Matatiele Stadium is a multi-use stadium in Matatiele, Eastern Cape, South Africa. It is currently used mostly for football matches and is the home ground of Matat Professionals.

Sports venues in the Eastern Cape
Soccer venues in South Africa